Pomacea cumingii is a species of freshwater snail in the family Ampullariidae. It is native to Saboga. A non-native population has been found in Puerto Rico.

Two subspecies of P. cumingii are recognized: P. c. cumingii and P. c. sanjoseensis (Morrison, 1946). P. c. sanjoseensis is found only in a few small streams on Isla San José and is larger than the other subspecies.

References

External links 

cumingii
Gastropods described in 1831
Freshwater snails
Endemic fauna of Panama
Molluscs of South America